Kathryn Hume (born 1945) is an academic writer on medieval literature (Old English, Middle English, Old Icelandic), on fantasy, and on contemporary fiction. Hume is Edwin Erle Sparks Emerita Professor of English, Penn State University. She won the IAFA Distinguished Scholarship Award in 1988.

Education 
Hume graduated from Harvard University and University of Pennsylvania.

Works
 The Owl and the Nightingale: The Poem and its Critics, 1975
 Fantasy and Mimesis: Responses to Reality in Western Literature, 1984
 Pynchon's Mythography: An Approach to Gravity's Rainbow, 1987
 Calvino's Fictions: Cogito and Cosmos, 1992
 American Dream, American Nightmare: Fiction since 1960, 2000
 Surviving your Academic Job Hunt: Advice for Humanities PhDs, 2005, 2010
 Aggressive Fictions: Reading the Contemporary American Novel, 2012
 The Metamorphoses of Myth in Fiction since 1960, 2020

References

American academics of English literature
Pennsylvania State University faculty
1945 births
Living people
Harvard University alumni
University of Pennsylvania alumni